Stenoptilia nurolhaki is a moth of the family Pterophoridae. It is known from Asia, including Mongolia.

External links
Federmotten aus der Mongolei, Russland, der Türkei, der Balkanhalbinsel und Afrika, mit Beschreibung neuer Arten (Microlepidoptera: Pterophoridae)

nurolhaki
Moths described in 1967
Moths of Asia
Taxa named by Hans Georg Amsel